Aarom German Baldiris Pérez (born January 5, 1983) is a former Venezuelan professional baseball third baseman. He played for the Samsung Lions.  was his first year playing in Nippon Pro Baseball with the Tigers. He wore #52 and was a third baseman. He batted and threw right-handed.

Career

Minor league career
Bardiris was originally drafted by the New York Mets out of high school at the age of seventeen. He started off at the Rookie-Class Venezuelan Summer League and played there until , and missed the entire  season due to an injury.

Career in Japan

There, the Hanshin Tigers selected him to be on the team's #1 roster. He struggled the first couple of weeks, but as the season went on, his batting average rose. On July 5, 2009 in a game against the Yakult Swallows, Baldiris hit his first NPB Home Run. It was a lead off home run off Masanori Ishikawa. He would later be chosen as one of the "Heroes" of that game along with the Tigers starting pitcher, Yasutomo Kubo. From 2010 to 2013 Baldris played for the Orix Buffaloes.

Career in South Korea
In 2016 Baldiris has played for the Samsung Lions.

External links
, or Pelota Binaria (Venezuelan Winter League)

1983 births
Living people
Arizona League Rangers players
Binghamton Mets players
Brooklyn Cyclones players
Capital City Bombers players
Frisco RoughRiders players
Hanshin Tigers players
KBO League third basemen
Kingsport Mets players
Navegantes del Magallanes players
Nippon Professional Baseball third basemen
Oklahoma City RedHawks players
Orix Buffaloes players
People from Caracas
Samsung Lions players
St. Lucie Mets players
Tigres de Aragua players
Trenton Thunder players
Venezuelan expatriate baseball players in Japan
Venezuelan expatriate baseball players in South Korea
Venezuelan expatriate baseball players in the United States
Yokohama DeNA BayStars players